The Battle of the Delta was a sea battle between Egypt and the Sea Peoples, circa 1175 BCE, when the Egyptian pharaoh Ramesses III repulsed a major sea invasion. The conflict occurred on the shores of the eastern Nile Delta and on the border of the Egyptian Empire in Syria, although precise locations of the battles are unknown. This major conflict is recorded on the temple walls of the mortuary temple of pharaoh Ramesses III at Medinet Habu.

Historical background
In the 12th century BC, the Sea Peoples (which consisted of several groups, such as Tjekker, Peleset, and Sherden) invaded the Middle East from the eastern Mediterranean Sea. They attacked Syria and the Southern Levant, where many cities were burned and ruined. (Carchemish was one of the cities which survived the Sea People's attacks.) Cyprus had also been overwhelmed and its capital sacked. Since the Medinet Habu inscriptions depict women and children loaded in ox carts, the attackers are believed to have been migrants looking for a place to settle. Their attacks are reported, for instance, in letters by Ammurapi, the last king of Ugarit, pleading for assistance from Eshuwara, the king of Alasiya:

The Sea People invasions are often listed among the causes or symptoms of the Bronze Age collapse. Ramesses had fought the Sea Peoples in southern Lebanon at the Battle of Djahy. Ramesses III describes a great movement of peoples in the East from the Mediterranean, which caused massive destruction of the former great powers of the Levant, Cyprus and Anatolia:

The battle
After defeating the Sea Peoples on land in Syria, Ramesses rushed back to Egypt where preparations for the invaders' assault had already been completed. Ramesses enticed the Sea Peoples and their ships into the mouth of the Nile, where he had assembled a fleet in ambush. Ramesses also lined the shores of the Nile Delta with ranks of archers who were ready to release volleys of arrows into the enemy ships if they attempted to land. Once within range, Ramesses ordered the archers fire at the enemy ships, pushing them back towards the fleet of Ramesses now coming in to cut off the Sea Peoples' escape route. This Egyptian fleet pushed the Sea Peoples' boats towards shore. Then archers and infantrymen both on land and on the ships devastated the enemy. The Sea People's ships were overturned, many were killed and captured and some were even dragged to the shore, where they were killed. In the inscriptions, Ramesses proclaims:

Aftermath
The victory at the Delta saved Egypt from the destruction that befell Hatti, Alasiya and other great Near Eastern powers.

There is no documentation for any pursuit of the defeated Sea Peoples. Although defeated in the Delta, some of the Sea Peoples (specifically the Peleset) are believed to have settled in the Southern Levant some time after Ramesses' death.

See also
 1177 B.C.: The Year Civilization Collapsed

References

External links
 Battle of the Nile Delta, 1178 BC at Rivers from Eden.
 Medinet Habu and the Sea Peoples at BYU-Idaho.

12th century BC
Delta
Delta
Sea Peoples
Ancient peoples
Nile Delta
Ramesses III
Delta
Delta
Twentieth Dynasty of Egypt
Late Bronze Age collapse
Landing operations